Tafseer Ali (born 19 September 1989) is a Norwegian cricketer who plays for the national team. In May 2019, he was named in Norway's squad for the Regional Finals of the 2018–19 ICC T20 World Cup Europe Qualifier tournament in Guernsey. He made his Twenty20 International (T20I) debut for Norway against Italy on 15 June 2019.

References

External links
 

1989 births
Living people
Norwegian cricketers
Norway Twenty20 International cricketers
Cricketers from Lahore
Pakistani emigrants to Norway